The Bantamweight class in the 1st AIBA African Olympic Boxing Qualifying Tournament competition.

List of boxers

Medalists

Results

Preliminary round

Quarterfinal Round

Semifinal Round

3rd place Round

Final Round

Qualification to Olympic games

References
AIBA

AIBA African 2008 Olympic Qualifying Tournament